Luis Guzmán (born August 28, 1956) is a Puerto Rican actor. His career spans over 40 years and includes a number of films and television series. He has appeared in the Paul Thomas Anderson films Boogie Nights (1997), Magnolia (1999) and Punch-Drunk Love (2002) and the Steven Soderbergh films Out of Sight (1998), The Limey (1999) and Traffic (2000). His other film credits include Q & A (1990), The Hard Way (1991), Carlito's Way (1993) and Keanu (2016). For his role in The Limey, he received a nomination for the Independent Spirit Award for Best Supporting Male.

On television, he starred as Raoul "El Cid" Hernandez on the HBO prison drama Oz (1998–2000), José Gonzalo Rodríguez Gacha on Narcos (2015), Jesse "Mama" Salander on the CBS medical drama Code Black (2015–18), Hector Contreras on Perpetual Grace, LTD (2019) and Gomez Addams on Wednesday (2022).

Early life
Guzmán was born in Cayey, Puerto Rico, and was raised in New York City's Greenwich Village and the surrounding Lower East Side neighborhood. His mother, Rosa, was a hospital worker, and his stepfather, Benjamin Cardona, was a TV repairman. Guzmán graduated from The American University and shortly after began his career as a social worker and moonlighted as an actor, eventually becoming heavily involved in street theater and independent films.

Career
Guzman's numerous movie credits include Carlito's Way, Carlito's Way: Rise to Power, Punch-Drunk Love, Welcome to Collinwood, Stonewall, Waiting..., The Salton Sea, and Lemony Snicket's A Series of Unfortunate Events. He has also appeared on the TV shows Homicide: Life on the Street, Frasier, Community and Oz and voiced Ricardo Diaz in the video game Grand Theft Auto: Vice City and its prequel Grand Theft Auto: Vice City Stories. Guzmán starred in the short-lived 2003 television comedy Luis, and is a commentator on VH1's I Love the '80s, as well as I Love Toys and its sequels, including I Love the '70s and I Love the '90s. He co-starred on the 2007 HBO series John from Cincinnati, which lasted one season.

In early 2008, Guzmán starred in "Naturally Aged Cheddar Hunks" TV ads for Cabot Creamery. He also appeared in the music video "Yes We Can." In 2010, he starred in HBO's How to Make It in America and appeared in a comical series of Snickers commercials that played during that year's Super Bowl.

Personal life
Guzmán resides in Sutton, Vermont.

Guzmán endorsed Senator Bernie Sanders for President in the 2016 U.S. presidential election.

In 2018, Guzmán, along with New York Yankees all-star Bernie Williams, appeared in a season six episode of Jon Taffer's Bar Rescue, offering assistance not only to the El Krajo Tavern in Loiza, but the town's community center, after it was devastated from Hurricane Maria.    

During Telegramgate, Guzmán was interviewed by MSNBC for his opinions on the situation in Puerto Rico and he expressed that "Ricky had to go" and that corruption on the island was a major problem that he hoped would be solved.

Filmography

Film

Television

Video games

Music videos

Awards and nominations

See also
 List of Puerto Ricans

References

External links

 
 

1956 births
Living people
California Democrats
City College of New York alumni
Hispanic and Latino American male actors
Male actors from New York City
Male actors from Vermont
New York (state) Democrats
Outstanding Performance by a Cast in a Motion Picture Screen Actors Guild Award winners
People from Cabot, Vermont
People from Cayey, Puerto Rico
People from Greenwich Village
People from the Lower East Side
Puerto Rican male film actors
Puerto Rican male television actors
Vermont Democrats
20th-century Puerto Rican male actors
21st-century Puerto Rican male actors